Alberto Soresina (born in Milan, 10 May 1911 and died in 2007) was an Italian musicologist and composer.

Biography 

Born in Milan in 1911, he studied at the Milan Conservatory and at Accademia Musicale Chigiana in Siena. He was a professor of singing at the Milan Conservatory and Turin Conservatory (1959-1962), and later composition at the Milan Conservatory.
 
One of his teachers was Vito Frazzi, and among his students were Luca Casagrande, Rubén Domínguez, Mario Duel, Franca Fabbri, Enrico Fissore, Andrea Forte, Stefano Secco, Mira Sulpizi, and Fausto Tenzi.

He composed several works for piano, choral and chamber music.

Works 

 Lanterna rossa (1942)
 Cuor di cristallo (1942)
 L'amuleto (1954)
 Tre sogni per Marina (1967)

References

External links
 Stanford University - OperaGlass - Opera Composers - S
 Edizioni Curci - Alberto Soresina

1911 births
2007 deaths
Musicians from Milan
Italian male classical composers
Italian classical composers
20th-century classical composers
Milan Conservatory alumni
Academic staff of Milan Conservatory
20th-century Italian composers
20th-century Italian musicologists
20th-century Italian male musicians